Berkheya fruticosa  (Afrikaans: vaaldissel, "pale pole") is a plant native to the Succulent Karoo of Namibia and South Africa.

It is a perennial meso-chamaephyte that grows 15–25 cm high. It has prickly leaves and grows dark yellow aster flowers.

References 

Flora of Namibia
Flora of South Africa
Plants described in 1788
Arctotideae
Taxa named by Carl Linnaeus